Dendi is a Songhay language used as a trade language across northern Benin (along the Niger River. It forms a dialect cluster with Zarma and Koyraboro Senni but it is heavily influenced by Bariba.

Dendi has been described as a four-tone language.

Distribution
Dendi is mainly spoken in Northern Benin, but also in other parts of Benin, and neighbouring countries. The Dendi people are the main group in the Departments of Alibori, Borgou, Donga, and Atakora.

In Nigeria, the Dendi people are found in Bordering States (Kebbi, Kwara, Niger, and Sokoto), and in other parts of Nigeria. They are usually referred by the Hausa name Dendawa (which is also used for the Songhai people).

Writing system

The grave accent, the acute accent and the macron are used on vowels to indicate tones.

References

Bibliography
 
 

Languages of Benin
Songhay languages
Dendi people